Little Sisters Book and Art Emporium v Canada (Minister of Justice) [2000] 2 S.C.R. 1120, 2000 SCC 69 is a leading Supreme Court of Canada decision on freedom of expression and equality rights under the Canadian Charter of Rights and Freedoms. It was held that the Customs Act, which gave broad powers to customs inspectors to exclude "obscene" materials, violated the right to freedom of expression under section 2 but was justifiable under section 1.

Background 

Little Sister's Book and Art Emporium is a bookstore in Vancouver, British Columbia, that sells gay and lesbian-related literature. It imports most of its material from the United States, which often caused trouble at the border when material was classified as obscene by Canada Customs and was thus refused entry. The bookstore challenged the provision of the Customs Act prohibiting the importation of obscene material as well as a section of the Act that put the onus on the importer to disprove obscenity.

The courts below 

At trial, the court found that the customs has targeted shipments to the bookstore and attempted to prevent their entry into Canada. Consequently, the government was found to have violated section 2 of the Charter. However, the violation was justified under section 1.

Judgment of the Supreme Court 

In a 6–3 decision, the Supreme Court upheld the ruling of the trial judge and found that though the law violated section 2, it was justified under section 1. The law was thus saved. However, they found that the way the law was implemented by customs officials was discriminatory and should be remedied, an opinion they suggested would avail the bookstore in any further legal battles. They also struck down part of the law that put the onus on an importer to prove material was not obscene. The ruling, therefore, upheld Canada Customs' right to prevent the importation of material that had already been banned as obscene by the courts, but curtailed the agency's right to preemptively or punitively detain material that had not been so adjudicated.

See also 
 List of Supreme Court of Canada cases (McLachlin Court)
 Censorship in Canada

Further reading

References

External links 
 
 Summary of case from mapleleafweb.com

Canadian Charter of Rights and Freedoms case law
Canadian freedom of expression case law
Supreme Court of Canada cases
Canadian LGBT rights case law
2000 in LGBT history
2000 in Canadian case law
Bookselling